Sir Arnold Plant (29 April 1898 – 19 April 1978) was a British economist.

Biography
Plant was born in Hoxton, London, the son of a municipal librarian, William Charles Plant, and Thomasine Emily Plant.
After attending Strand School, he worked for a mechanical engineering organisation.
At the advice of William Piercy, he set out to learn about management.
He obtained a BCom degree (1922) and a BSc degree in Economics (1923; specialising in modern economic history) from the London School of Economics.

He worked as a professor at the University of Cape Town (1923–1930) and at the London School of Economics (1930–1965).

Plant's 1934 paper on patents, "The Economic Theory Concerning Patents for Inventions", is considered a classic.

In 1947, he was knighted. He died in 1978. His widow, Edith, Lady Plant, died a decade later.

Published work (selection)

References

External links
 Arnold Plant Collection at the British Library of Political and Economic Science

1898 births
1978 deaths
English economists
Knights Bachelor
People from Hoxton
Alumni of the London School of Economics